This Woman Is Dangerous is a 1952 American film noir crime drama by Warner Bros. starring Joan Crawford, David Brian, and Dennis Morgan in a story about a gun moll's romances with two different men, against the background of her impending blindness. The screenplay by Geoffrey Homes and George Worthing Yates was based on a story by Bernard Girard. The film was directed by Felix E. Feist and produced by Robert Sisk.

Plot summary
A gangster woman, Beth Austin (Crawford), plagued by headaches, is rapidly losing her eyesight, as her eye doctor tells her. Criminals dressed as police raid a gambling house where Beth is visiting, and rifle the safe; it is revealed that she planned for the raid to happen. She intends to visit a famous eye clinic in Indiana, as she tells her gangster boyfriend Matt Jackson, who is suspicious about her reasons for leaving. 

Dr. Ben Halleck tells her the operation is very risky and unlikely to succeed; she tells him to go ahead. Matt, traveling in Louisiana in a trailer with his brother Will and towed by his sister-in-law Ann, kills a policeman who stops them after Matt gets angry and throws a bottle of liquor out the window. Beth lies in bed, eyes bandaged, avoiding movement, for weeks during recovery. 

Matt phones her, but the phone is being tapped by police suspicious of her because of her ties (including her fingerprints in the trailer) to Jackson, whom the police are hunting after the policeman's murder. 
When Beth's bandages are removed, she can see again, but must wear goggles for a while. At her champagne farewell dinner at the clinic, Halleck tells her she must stay in town for a while, at a nearby hotel, even after leaving the clinic. 

Ben develops an interest in her and plans dinner with her at the hotel, but phones her there and says he is busy. A private investigator, Joe Crossland, runs into her there, and intimates that he's working for Matt and wants her to be careful. 

Ben drives her to go shopping in Indianapolis, though he has to stop at a woman's prison, and she waits in the car, Beth relives old experiences as she witnesses a guard yelling at prisoners. Ben returns and says the prisoner died holding his hand. At Ben's home, Beth meets his young daughter Susan and helps her cook. Ben reveals his wife left him for another man. Beth tearfully tells him she can't stay with him, and must leave promptly. 

Crossland tries to shake her down in exchange for not telling Matt about the situation; she slaps him and he leaves. Ben is debriefed by the FBI about Beth's ties to Matt. Matt fights Will, who doesn't want Matt to have guns or deal further with Beth, and shoves Ann, who threatens him with a gun; Will and Ann relent and let him have the guns. 

Ben has to do an emergency operation for a farmboy; Beth is sent for supplies. Beth leaves information with a Chicago florist for Matt, saying she'll see Matt in the morning. 

She plans to take a bus out of town, but relents. At the farmhouse. she holds a light for Ben during the operation; Ben says the boy will recover. At the bus station, Ben reveals he knows about Matt; Beth says she's going back to Matt, whom she owes a debt for past favors. She leaves on a bus to Louisville, Kentucky. Crossland speaks to the FBI, pondering cooperation. 

Beth arrives at the Jacksons, and learns Crossland kept them informed, and that Matt left to go kill Ben. They all leave for Indiana. Matt has Crossland trapped and interrogates him to learn Ben's name; after Matt leaves, Crossland calls the FBI, but Matt returns and kills him. Matt goes to Ben's hospital, and watches him perform surgery.

Beth's party sees Crossland's body taken away, then at the hospital, Beth finds Matt watching Ben and others perform surgery. The police, alerted by a nurse Matt spoke to, shoot Will, who shot several police. Matt breaks a window and asks which surgeon is Ben; Ben takes off his mask, but Beth hits away his gun as he fires at Ben. 

The doctors run, Matt fires at Beth and wounds her, and the police kill Matt as he tries to escape: he crashes through the glass into the operating theater. FBI man Franklin says Beth may get leniency for her good deeds, and Ben and Beth hold hands as they hope for an eventual better future.

Cast
 Joan Crawford as Elizabeth 'Beth' Austin
 Dennis Morgan as Dr. Ben Halleck
 David Brian as Matt Jackson
 Mari Aldon as Ann Jackson
 Richard Webb as Franklin
 Philip Carey as Will Jackson
 Ian MacDonald as Joe Crossland
 Katherine Warren as Admitting Nurse
 George Chandler as Dr. Ryan
 Sherry Jackson as Susan Halleck

Production
Since the script of a gangster who saw the light had become trite by the 1950s, some sources suggest that studio head Jack L. Warner offered Crawford the role hoping the expensive star would turn it down so he could put her on suspension. That could also be the reason he offered the eye surgeon's role to Dennis Morgan, whose box-office appeal had diminished since World War II. To Warner's surprise, both stars accepted the film. Crawford later instructed her agents to negotiate an end to her contract at Warner Bros., and she went on to make the independently produced hit Sudden Fear, which earned the actress her third Academy Award nomination.

Reception
Bosley Crowther in The New York Times called the film "junk", and Otis Guernsey Jr. of the New York Herald Tribune described it as "a long, windy, tiresome story."

DVD release
This Woman Is Dangerous was released on Region 1 DVD on March 23, 2009 (Crawford's birthday) from the online Warner Bros. Archive Collection.

Radio adaptation
This Woman Is Dangerous was presented on Lux Radio Theatre on March 16, 1953. The one-hour adaptation starred Virginia Mayo, with Morgan reprising his role from the film.

References

External links 
 
 
 
 

1952 films
1952 crime drama films
American black-and-white films
Films directed by Felix E. Feist
Films scored by David Buttolph
American crime drama films
Warner Bros. films
1950s English-language films
1950s American films
Films about disability